Fon may refer to:

Terms
 Fon (title), a traditional title for a ruler in Cameroon
 Fiber-optic network
 Freedom of navigation
 The chemistry mnemonic "FON", used for determining which elements hydrogen forms hydrogen bonds with.
 Fon language, spoken by the Fon people
 Funding Opportunity Number, assigned by United States federal agencies to available grants

Organizations
 Fon (company), a Wi-Fi provider
 Federation of Ontario Naturalists, now Ontario Nature, a Canadian environmental organization
 FON University, university in Macedonia
 University of Belgrade Faculty of Organizational Sciences, faculty in Serbia
 Fundusz Obrony Narodowej, or Fund for National Defense, a collection attempt in Poland prior to World War II
 Sprint Corporation

People
 Fon people, a major West African ethnic and linguistic group
 Bryn Fôn (born 1954), Welsh actor and musician

Other
 Fish On Next, a video game
Fon Fjord in Greenland

See also
 Fun (disambiguation)
 Fawn (disambiguation)
 Faun (disambiguation)
 Phon (disambiguation)

Language and nationality disambiguation pages